Mirko Kovač (26 December 1938 – 19 August 2013) was a Yugoslav writer. In his rich career he wrote novels, short stories, essays, film scripts, TV and radio plays. Among his best known works are the novels Gubilište, Životopis Malvine Trifković, Vrata od utrobe, Grad u zrcalu, the short story collection Ruže za Nives Koen, the book of essays Europska trulež and the scripts for some of the most successful films of Yugoslav cinema like Handcuffs, Playing Soldiers and Occupation in 26 Pictures among others. He was one quarter of the infamous Belgrade quartet, the other three being Danilo Kiš, Borislav Pekić and Filip David.

Biography
Kovač was born to a Croat father and a Serb mother in the village of Petrovići in Banjani region near Nikšić, Montenegro. He went to elementary school in Trebinje but after leaving his family at the age of 16 he went to Vojvodina where he finished high school in Novi Sad. During that time he discovered the works of poet Tin Ujević and became interested in literature. He went on to study the works of other notable Croatian authors like Ranko Marinković, Vladan Desnica, Antun Branko Šimić and Vjekoslav Kaleb. After finishing school he published his first essay called Tri pesnika (Three Poets) about the works of Tin Ujević, Branko Miljković and Oskar Davičo. His first book Gubilište was published in 1962 and caused a big bang on the Yugoslav literature scene. The communist authorities declared the book inappropriate because of its dark portrayal of life and started a campaign against Kovač which resulted in a year long polemic. Many authors including Predrag Matvejević and Danilo Kiš wrote in Kovač's defence.

He received: Serbian NIN Prize 1978 and Andrić Award 1979, Swedish PEN Tucholsky Award (1993), German Herder Prize (1995), Montenegrin Njegoš Award (2009) and 13th July award (2004), Slovenian Vilenica Award (2003), Croatian Vladimir Nazor Award (2008) etc. He lived in Belgrade, but moved to Rovinj, Croatia, his wife's hometown, after Slobodan Milošević came to power.

An annual award in his name is given to authors from the Balkans in four categories.

Bibliography
 Gubilište (1962), novel
 Moja sestra Elida (1965), novel
 Malvina (1971), novella
 Rane Luke Meštrevića (1971), short story collection
 Ruganje sa dušom (1976), novel
 Vrata od utrobe (1978), novel (NIN award)
 Uvod u drugi život (1983), novel
 Evropska trulež (1986), essays
 Nebeski zaručnici (1987), short story collection
 Okupacija u 26 slika i drugi scenariji (1990), film scripts
 Evropska trulež i drugi eseji (1994), essays
 Bodež u srcu (1995), publicist texts
 Kristalne rešetke (1995), novel
 Rastresen život (1996), novel
 Cvjetanje mase (1997), essays
 Knjiga pisama 1992-1995 (1998), correspondence with Filip David
 Isus na koži (2003), dramas
 Grad u zrcalu (2007), novel
 Pisanje ili nostalgija (2008), essays
 Ruže za Nives Koen (2009), short story collection
 Vrijeme koje se udaljava (2013), memoir

Screenplays:

 Playing Soldiers
 Lisice
 Passion According to Matthew
 Occupation in 26 Pictures
 The Fall of Italy
 Evening Bells
 Tetoviranje
 Libertas

References

Sources

External links

Croatian novelists
Croatian male writers
Male novelists
Croatian screenwriters 
1938 births
2013 deaths
Writers from Nikšić
Vladimir Nazor Award winners
Montenegrin novelists
20th-century Serbian novelists
Herder Prize recipients
Yugoslav writers
Serbian writers
Serbian novelists
20th-century male writers
Croatian people of Serbian descent 
Montenegrin people of Serbian descent 
Montenegrin people of Croatian descent 
Serbian people of Croatian descent